Four Dimensions is an album by organist Don Patterson recorded in 1967 and released on the Prestige label. The CD is titled Just Friends combined with a Don Patterson, Booker Ervin session without a guitarist.

Reception

Allmusic awarded the album 3 stars stating "it's nothing out of the ordinary, but it won't be a letdown to fans of the genre".

Track listing 
 "Red Top" (Gene Ammons, Lionel Hampton, Ben Kynard) - 10:13  
 "Freddie Tooks Jr." (Patterson) - 5:43  
 "Last Train from Overbrook" (James Moody) - 3:55  
 "Embraceable You" (George Gershwin, Ira Gershwin) - 9:21  
 "Sandu" (Clifford Brown) - 4:43

Personnel 
Don Patterson - organ
Houston Person - tenor saxophone
Pat Martino - guitar
Billy James - drums

References 

Don Patterson (organist) albums
1968 albums
Prestige Records albums
Albums produced by Don Schlitten
Albums recorded at Van Gelder Studio